The following is a list of presidents of the Puerto Rico Government Development Bank, which until 2017 was the Commonwealth's main financial and economic development agency along with the Puerto Rico Department of Treasury and the Puerto Rico Department of Economic Development and Commerce.

References

Cabinet-level officers of the Cabinet of Puerto Rico
Government Development Bank